Elena Alexieva (Bulgarian: Елена Алексиева born 12 April 1975) is a Bulgarian writer.

Life 
Alexieva at the First English Language School in Sofia. She majored in International Economic Relations at the University of National and World Economics in Sofia, and continued her studies in the Doctoral Program in Semiotics at New Bulgarian University, Sofia. She has taught translation from English into Bulgarian and from Bulgarian into English at New Bulgarian University since 2007.

In 2016, she appeared at the New Literature from Europe Festival..

Books 
Poetry 
 Бримка на сърцето (Ladder on the Heart), 1994. 
 Лице на ангел-екзекутор (Face of Killer Angel), 1996. 

Novel
 Синята стълба (The Blue Stairway), 2000.
 Рицарят, дяволът, смъртта (Knight, Devil, and Death), 2007. 
 Тя е тук (She Is Here), 2009.
 Нобелистът (Novel Prize), 2012.

Short stories, 
 Читателска група 31 (Readers’ Group 31), 2005. 
 Кой? (Who), 2006. 
 Синдикатът на домашните любимци (Pets Syndicated), 2010.

References

External links 
 Elena Alexieva's Profile at the Contemporary Bulgarian Writers Website
 Elena Alexieva at the website of Colibri Publishing House
 Elena Alexieva at LiterNet 

1975 births
Living people
20th-century Bulgarian poets
20th-century Bulgarian women writers
20th-century Bulgarian writers
21st-century Bulgarian women writers
21st-century Bulgarian writers
20th-century Bulgarian novelists
21st-century Bulgarian novelists
Bulgarian women poets
Bulgarian novelists
Bulgarian women novelists
20th-century Bulgarian short story writers
21st-century Bulgarian short story writers
Bulgarian women short story writers
Writers from Sofia
University of National and World Economy alumni